Melanio Báez (born c. July 1931, date of death unknown) was a Paraguayan football midfielder who played for Paraguay in the 1950 FIFA World Cup. He also played for Club Nacional. Báez is deceased.

References

External links
FIFA profile

1931 births
Year of death missing
Paraguayan footballers
Paraguay international footballers
Association football midfielders
Club Nacional footballers
1950 FIFA World Cup players